30th Division may refer to:

Infantry units
 30th Division (1st Formation)(People's Republic of China), 1949–1952
 30th Division (German Empire)
 30th Reserve Division (German Empire)
 30th Infantry Division (Wehrmacht), Germany
 30th Waffen Grenadier Division of the SS, Germany
 30th Infantry Division Sabauda, Kingdom of Italy
 30th Division (Imperial Japanese Army)
 30th Infantry Division (Poland)
 30th Rifle Division, Soviet Union
 30th Division (United Kingdom)
 30th Infantry Division (United States)
 30th Division (Yugoslav Partisans), 1943–1945

Other units
 30th Armored Division (United States)
 30th Cavalry Division (Soviet Union)
 30th Division (Syria), established 2017
 Division 30, a 2015 Syrian rebel group

See also 
 List of military divisions by number
 30th Army (disambiguation)
 30th Battalion (disambiguation)
 30th Brigade (disambiguation)
 XXX Corps (disambiguation)
 30th Regiment (disambiguation)
 30 Squadron (disambiguation)